Thirteens is an album by Leona Naess, released in the U.S. on 16 September 2008 by Verve Forecast Records, and released in the UK on 11 May 2009 by Polydor Records.

The album was influenced by the death of Naess's father, Arne Næss, Jr., in a mountaineering accident in January 2004. Naess returned to London from New York City and eventually began writing and recording songs with music producer Samuel Dixon. Naess recorded with almost no budget, asking friends to contribute, and completed thirteen albums’ worth of material. Eleven songs were selected for the release, titled Thirteens. Described as "a sweet and poignant collection" by New York magazine, much of the album deals with the onset of maturity. The album consists of first takes, which were then overdubbed.

A digital download of the album available on the iTunes Store includes a bonus track featuring singer-songwriter Ryan Adams; an exclusive edition available through retailer Barnes & Noble includes two bonus tracks. The UK release includes two bonus tracks unavailable on previous releases of the album.

Track listing

Personnel
Asif Ahmed – management
Felix Bloxsom – percussion, drums, keyboards
Andy Bradfield – mixing
Greg Calbi – mastering
The Christiania String Quartet
Camilla Kjøll – first violin
Lina Marie Årnes – second violin
Ida Bryhn – viola
Andreas Torday Gulden – cello
Rupert Cobb – trumpet
Jason Darling – bass, electric guitar, producer, drum programming
Samuel Dixon – acoustic guitar, bass, mandolin, piano, glockenspiel, electric guitar, harmonium, melodica, producer, engineer, Mellotron, clapping
Emery Dobyns – engineer, mixing
Tormod Gangfløt – string arrangements
Larry Goldings – keyboards
Lisa Hansen  – release coordinator
Harry's Tribeca Alcoholic Choir  – background vocals
Jimmy Hogarth – acoustic guitar, banjo, percussion, electric guitar, programming, producer, executive producer, piano engineer
Andy Kman – release coordinator
Oliver Kraus – strings
Bengt Lagerberg – drums
Nathan Larson – organ, bass, electric guitar, producer
Sophie Michalitsianos – cello, cello arrangements, piano
Leona Naess – acoustic guitar, percussion, piano, electric guitar, vocals, producer, vibraphone, clapping
John Newcott – release coordinator
Al Newman – art direction, design
Tom Schick – engineer
Gus Seyffert – acoustic guitar, electric guitar, acoustic bass
Zakee Shariff – art direction, design
Martin Slattery – piano
Mia Theodoratus – harp
Chris Thile – mandolin
Eva Vermandel – photography
Joey Waronker – drums

References

Erlewin, Stephen Thomas. "[ Thirteens]". Allmusic.

2008 albums
2009 albums
Leona Naess albums
Polydor Records albums
Verve Forecast Records albums
Albums produced by Samuel Dixon